Lawrence Bridges is a writer and film maker.

Career
Bridges began his film career as a production assistant on Francis Ford Coppola's film The Conversation. He became an editor of music videos, most notably with director Bob Giraldi for Michael Jackson's "Beat It", and director Joe Pytka for "Dirty Diana", and "The Way You Make Me Feel". He then founded the post-production company Red Car Inc. and began directing and editing commercials for clients such as Coca-Cola, Nike, Reebok, Honda commercials featuring Lou Reed and Devo, Michelob Beer, among many others. He cast Brad Pitt in a Pringles commercial, one of the actor's first gigs. For the Rock the Vote campaign, Bridges directed an ad featuring Robert Downey Jr. and Sarah Jessica Parker.

In a 1987 Rolling Stone interview Stanley Kubrick, in reference to a series of Michelob commercials that Bridges had edited, remarked that these were "some of the most spectacular examples of film art" and "the editing was some of the most brilliant work I've ever seen." In his book, Where the Suckers Moon, Randal Rothenberg reported that Bridges coined the term "metacommercial", an ad that offers up a knowing, even mocking commentary on the very thing it is doing. Bridges practically ushered in post-modern advertising in an ad for Honda Motor Scooters that was accompanied by Lou Reed's counterculture anthem "Walk on the Wild Side". Bridges added several letters to the alphabet of editing with this commercial's quick cuts, blurry texture, flash frames, reel run outs, and techniques culled from the French New Wave.

Bridges was named "Best Advertising Auteur" by Connoisseur Magazine in 1989, inspiring the magazine to write, "Whenever you see an ad that verges on art, chances are good that Bridges had a hand in it--as either director, editor or graphic designer." "...The techniques he pioneered as a backlash to formulaic commercials are now staples of the industry, as well as hallmarks of countless Hollywood feature films aiming for 'realism.'".<ref name=LAT>[https://articles.latimes.com/2002/mar/24/magazine/tm-34463 Miles Beller, "No Rules", 'Los Angeles Times, March 24, 2002.]</ref>

Work12, initially projected on buildings from parking lots in New York, Los Angeles, San Francisco and Dallas, began the urban Guerrilla drive-in movement in the early 2000s (decade). Robert Koehler of Variety Magazine called the film "A dizzying, unforgettable adventure" while Dean Treadway of "Filmicability" placed it among his favorite 100 films of all time. 12 has also played at over 15 festivals worldwide and was honored with a "Best of Fest" award at the Syracuse International Film and Video Festival in 2004. The December 2003 issue of American Cinematographer featured an article on Lawrence's cinematography for the film as well. 12 continues to play at various midnight screenings across Los Angeles.

Bridges' first poetry appeared in Stanford’s Sequoia Magazine in 1971 and later in Poetry and The New Yorker, while Bridges was starting his career in filmmaking in New York city, balancing jobs in editing TV commercials and driving a taxi cab. With the publication of Horses on Drums in 2006  Bridges was immediately described by Paul-Victor Winters as one of the new  "Dissociative Poets",  identified by Tony Hoagland   as poets who do not write in traditional forms and eschew logical syntactical development, suggesting that our visual culture makes the crafting of traditional and linear narrative a difficult and boring task. Bridges' second book, Flip Days, was published in 2009  followed by  Brownwood in 2016. 
He wrote the libretto for Jonathan Berger's "Tweets of Talya" which debuted at Stanford University in October 2015. Bridges has been a member of the Advisory Board of the Virginia Quarterly Review since 2011 

In 2006, Bridges produced "StrangerAdventures", which was the first internet/TV game show where players from anywhere in the world could become participants with the main characters. The participants competed for cash and prizes during the week-long game. The show was nominated for a New Media Emmy award that same year.

Bridges is the creator of The Interview, (Kerry Reid, Chicago Tribune,) a theatrical production in which an interviewer instructs a solo performer to respond to instructions with personal stories in front of a live audience. The performer, a different one each night, is not given any prior knowledge of the instruction or prompts that will come their way.

Bridges is the President and CEO of Red Car Inc., a TV commercial production and post-production company he founded in 1982 with offices in New York, Chicago, Dallas, and Los Angeles.

References

Further reading
 "Bridges Proves It Really Does Matter for Zapp". Back Stage''. February 7, 1986. p. 57

External links
 

1948 births
Living people
American filmmakers
American television producers
Tuck School of Business alumni
Stanford University alumni